Monteagle may refer to :

 Monteagle, Tennessee
 Monteagle, New South Wales, a small town in Hilltops Council
 Edward Stanley, 1st Baron Monteagle (died 1523) High Sheriff of Lancashire, 1485–1497
 William Parker, 4th Baron Monteagle (1575–1622), English peer, involved in the arrest of the Gunpowder plotters
 Baron Monteagle or Baron Mount Eagle, a title that has been created three times: in the Peerage of England, in the Peerage of Ireland and in the Peerage of the United Kingdom
 Baron Monteagle of Brandon, a title in the Peerage of the United Kingdom created in 1839